Civic Center or Civic Centre names a prominent land area within a community that is constructed to be its focal point or center.

Specific civic centers include the following:

Canada
 Ottawa Civic Centre

United Kingdom 
 Cardiff Civic Centre, also known as Cathays Park
 Hampstead Civic Centre, which was only partially completed, of which only the Swiss Cottage Library (1964) still exists
 Sunderland Civic Centre (1970)
 St. Albans Civic Centre which includes in the Alban Arena
 Civic Centre, Dagenham (1937)
 Newcastle Civic Centre (1967)
 Southampton Civic Centre (1932)
 Newport Civic Centre (main building 1940, clock tower completed 1964)
 Swansea Civic Centre (opened in 1982 as the County Hall)
 Civic Centre, an old official name for the town centre of Wythenshawe in Manchester, England

United States (by state)
 Civic Center, Manhattan
 Pine Bluff Civic Center, in Pine Bluff, AR, listed on the NRHP in Arkansas
 Azusa Civic Center, in Azusa, CA, listed on the NRHP in California
 Baltimore Civic Center, in Baltimore, Maryland, since 2014 the Royal Farms Arena
 Berkeley Historic Civic Center District, in Berkeley, CA, listed on the NRHP in California
 Civic Center, Los Angeles, California, a neighborhood including cluster of government buildings
 Civic Center Financial District (Pasadena, California), listed on the NRHP in California
 San Diego Civic Center, in San Diego, CA, listed on the NRHP in California
 San Francisco Civic Center Historic District, in San Francisco, CA, listed on the NRHP in California
 Civic Center, San Francisco, San Francisco, California
 Marin County Civic Center, in San Rafael, CA, listed on the NRHP in California
 Olive Civic Center, in Orange, CA, listed on the NRHP in Orange County, California
 Pasadena Civic Center District, in Pasadena, CA, listed on the NRHP in California
 Civic Center, Denver, Denver, Colorado
 Civic Center Historic District (Denver, Colorado), listed on the NRHP in Denver, Colorado
 Hartford Civic Center, a sports and convention center in Hartford, Connecticut
 St. Augustine Civic Center, St. Augustine, FL, listed on the NRHP in Florida
 Tallahassee-Leon County Civic Center, Tallahassee, Florida, which includes Donald L. Tucker Center, a multi-purpose arena
 Lihue Civic Center Historic District, Lihue, HI, listed on the NRHP in Hawaii
 Wailuku Civic Center Historic District, Wailuku, HI, listed on the NRHP in Hawaii
 Peoria Civic Center, a convention center with an arena in downtown Peoria, Illinois
 Civic Center of Greater Des Moines, Iowa
 Civic Center Historic District (Des Moines, Iowa), listed on the NRHP in Iowa
 Cumberland County Civic Center, an arena in Portland, Maine
 Peabody Civic Center Historic District, Peabody, MA, listed on the NRHP in Massachusetts
 Duluth Civic Center Historic District, Duluth, MN, listed on the NRHP in Minnesota
 Saint Paul Civic Center Arena, a former arena in the RiverCentre of St. Paul, Minnesota
 Griswold Civic Center Historic District, Allegan, MI, listed on the NRHP in Michigan
 Mid-Hudson Civic Center, Poughkeepsie, New York
 Hamilton Historic Civic Center, Hamilton, OH, listed on the NRHP in Ohio
 Civic Center (Bartlesville, Oklahoma), listed on the NRHP in Oklahoma
 Barrington Civic Center, Barrington, RI, listed on the NRHP in Rhode Island
 Providence Civic Center, former name of Dunkin' Donuts Center in Providence, Rhode Island
 Warwick Civic Center Historic District, Warwick, RI, listed on the NRHP in Rhode Island
 Florence Civic Center, an arena in Florence, South Carolina
 Longview Civic Center Historic District, Longview, WA, listed on the NRHP in Washington
 Civic Center Historic District (Kenosha, Wisconsin), listed on the NRHP in Wisconsin

Pakistan 

 Civil Center, Karachi

Other places
 Civic Center (Shenzhen)
 Civic Center (Delhi)

See also

Civic Center Historic District (disambiguation)
Civic Center Station (disambiguation)